The National Eagle Center is a nonprofit educational, interpretive center located on the banks of the Mississippi River in Wabasha, Minnesota, United States, that focuses on education about eagles and the Upper Mississippi River watershed. 
In addition to opportunities to view wild eagles throughout the year from viewing decks, non-releasable bald eagles and golden eagles are on exhibit at the center as well as interactive exhibits on eagle science and history.

History
The site is located where hundreds of bald eagles congregate to scavenge and hunt fish year round due to a geographic anomaly at the confluence of the Mississippi and Chippewa Rivers. The Chippewa River's sedimentary deposits formed a delta creating Lake Pepin, a naturally occurring lake on the Mississippi formed by the backup of water. The fast running water exiting the Chippewa delta prevents ice from being able to form on much of the Mississippi River in that area during the winter making it a good fishing ground for migrating eagles.

In 1989, an informal group of local volunteers called Eagle Watch led by Mary Rivers partnered with the Wabasha Chamber of Commerce to develop an abandoned deck built for paddleboats to disembark passengers on the river for eagle enthusiasts coming to see bald eagles. In their first year of operation they tallied more than a thousand people who showed up in the middle of winter to look at bald eagles.

In 1995, EagleWatch incorporated as a nonprofit and worked with the City of Wabasha which functioned as the fiscal agent for both State and Federal funds. The National Eagle Center received Federal recognition in 1998 which cleared the way for the U.S. Army Corps of Engineers, the Fish and Wildlife Service and other agencies to assist in its development. The City of Wabasha later dropped its cooperative venture with EagleWatch to manage the Eagle Center, partnering instead with the National Audubon Society. In June 1999 the City of Wabasha contracted with the National Audubon Society to take over operations of the National Eagle Center from EagleWatch for eighteen months but later declined to renew the contract and "severed the ties" when it was discovered that most of the membership fees and donations raised were going to the support the National Audubon Society's State and National programs rather than to the National Eagle Center. The city was also alarmed over the National Audubon Society's decision to change the vision of the project substantially. The City of Wabasha then resumed its partnership with EagleWatch to take over the management of the National Eagle Center in July 2001.

In 2000, under its then executive director Mary Beth Garrigan, the National Eagle Center opened a temporary year-round interpretive center in downtown Wabasha in a storefront building that formerly housed a bar. The center included two live permanently injured and non-releasable bald eagles, named Harriet and Angel.

In May 2007, in a partnership with the City of Wabasha, the National Eagle Center opened  interpretive center on the banks of the Mississippi River on the site of the Big Jo Flour Mill at the corner of Pembroke Avenue and Lawrence Boulevard in Wabasha. The facility, designed by LHB, Inc., includes a living aviary, environmental and cultural exhibits, classrooms, auditorium, indoor and outdoor viewing space, and gift shop. In its new building the National Eagle Center provides programming on Environmental Stewardship, Native American history, the culture of the region, and the important symbolic role of the bald eagle in the American military.

Future expansion plans
In 2016 the National Eagle Center revealed plans for a 15,000-square-foot expansion that would incorporate four historic buildings next to its existing structure in addition to adding an outdoor amphitheater, and more room to take care of the center's captive eagles. The expansion will also include additional gallery space to accommodate items from the Preston Cook Collection, over 25,000 items of art and artifacts depicting the eagle in American culture. Artworks include an original 1830s prints by naturalist and artist John James Audubon and Andy Warhol's 1983 bald eagle print.

Facilities

Aviary and eagles 
The National Eagle Center, which houses both permanently injured and non-releasable bald and golden eagles call their resident eagles "ambassadors." The eagles are housed in a climate-controlled interior aviary with glass panels that allow visitors to watch the eagles from a distance. Visitors are also able to enter the aviary when permitted.

Eagle ambassadors
 Angel - Found on the ground with a broken wing near Grantsburg, WI 1999. Arrived at the Center in 2000.
 Columbia - Injured in a vehicle collision that fractured her right shoulder and was found to have nearly twice the lethal dose of lead in her blood. Arrived at the Center in 2003.
 Was'aka - Blind in his left eye due to a tumor, since removed. Arrived at the Center in 2009.
 Latsch - Blind in his left eye. Was found in the summer of 2016 on the ground. Arrived at the Center in 2018.

Past eagle ambassadors 
Bald eagle
 Harriet - The first eagle ambassador and arrived at the National Eagle Center in 2000. A vehicle collision in 1998 left her left wing badly dislocated and was partly amputated. Harriet died in May 2016 at the age of 35.

Golden eagle
 Donald - Hit by a car and his right wing was broken in two places. Arrived at the Center in 2008. He died on March 16, 2020, due to suspected complications of a stroke.

Native American artifact exhibit
An  "object theater" features ancestral artifacts of the late Jim Stokes, a descendant of Chief Wapasha III and an active supporter of the Eagle Center. The objects are in a darkened room, when people are present, a light over an item will comes on and the recorded voice of Stokes provides information on the object, then the light will dim and another will activate featuring another object.

Observation decks
The facility provides an exterior 25' high deck, as well as a river-level deck for viewing bald eagles complete with spotting scopes provide opportunity to view wild eagles over the adjoining Mississippi River and backwaters, as well as river traffic and other species of wildlife.

Other facilities
 Classrooms, lecture facilities and community gathering area
 Exhibit areas to allow a variety of exhibits
 preserved animal specimens
 preserved birds in flight

Events
SOAR with the Eagles

SOAR With the Eagles is an annual festival celebrating the Bald Eagle spring migration along the Mississippi River. Visitors enjoy a variety of special programming at the center. The festival includes, but is not limited to, wild eagle viewing, animal presentations, flying bird shows, special exhibits, and educational programs.

Directors
 Heidi Hughes, 1996-1998
 Mary Beth Garrigan, 2000-2012 
 Rolf Thompson, 2012-2019 
 Meg Gammage-Tucker, 2020–present

Gallery

References

External links
 National Eagle Center in MNopedia, the Minnesota Encyclopedia 
 National Eagle Center - official site
 Preston Cook Collection of American Eagle memorabilia

Museums in Wabasha County, Minnesota
Natural history museums in Minnesota
Nature centers in Minnesota
Organizations established in 1989
Ornithological organizations in the United States
Wildlife rehabilitation and conservation centers
Zoology organizations
Raptor organizations